Christ Nagar Higher Secondary school started in 1976 as a private English Medium School in Trivandrum, India, recognised by the state government of Kerala as a minority educational institution. In 2002, Christ Nagar High School was upgraded to higher secondary level.

Schools 
Christ Nagar Group of Educational Institutions consists of four private schools, a teachers' training college, and a kindergarten:

The schools in Kowdiar share a campus near Vellayambalam Junction in Thiruvananthapuram, Kerala.

Achievements 
  The State School has secured cent percent pass, more than three State Ranks and the largest number of distinctions for a single school in the state every year at the public examinations for the last fifteen years.
 More than 5% of the SSLC students and more than 11% of the ISC students who passed out from the school have entered professional courses through entrance exams.
 Won the Computer Literary Award instituted by the Ministry of Communications and Information Technology, Government of India.
 The Christ Nagar international School kawdiar won the British Council's International School Award for the year 2005-06,
 A student of Christ Nagar Higher Secondary School, came second in the 2010 Indian Certificate of Secondary Education Board, scoring 98% in the exams.
 A student of Christ Nagar Higher Secondary School, topped the 2012 Indian School Certificate Board, scoring 99% in the exams.

Management 
 The Christ Nagar group of schools is owned and managed by the fathers of religious congregation of the Carmelites of Mary Immaculate (CMI) at Christ Hall, the CMI Monastery at Kowdiar, Trivandrum.
 All of the schools are co-educational.
 Rev. Fr. Mathew Thayil is the Manager to all the Christ Nagar Schools.
 The Principal of the International School is Fr. Sebastian Attichira CMI.

Admission 
Though under a Christian management, admission to the schools are open to all students irrespective of caste and creed
.

Notable alumni
 Raiphi Gomez - Indian First Class Cricketer
 Anoop Menon - Malayali actor, script writer, and lyricist
 Nazriya Nazim – actress
 Vidhu Prathap - playback singer
 Shankar Ramakrishnan - Malayalam film director and screenplay writer
Abhirami - South Indian actress

References

Carmelite educational institutions
Catholic schools in India
Christian schools in Kerala
High schools and secondary schools in Kerala
Private schools in Thiruvananthapuram
Educational institutions established in 1976
1976 establishments in Kerala